The Disappearance of the Girl is the debut studio album from British singer-songwriter Phildel. It was released on March 4, 2013 through Decca Records.

Track listing

Notes
"Holes In Your Coffin" was originally named 'Coffin Nails' back in 2008. 
“My imagination is the biggest inspiration for my work,” says Phildel. “In my imagination, I guess because of my past, there’s a lot of dark imagery and sinister feelings."

Personnel 
 Phildel Ng - vocals & backing vocals (all tracks); piano (tracks 9, 10, 11, 12); keyboard programming (tracks 1, 3, 6, 7, 12)
 Marky Bates - programming (tracks 1, 2, 3, 4, 6, 7, 8, 9, 10)
 Sean McGhee - programming (tracks 4, 6, 8, 10)
 Ross Collum - programming (track 7)
 Adam Morris - orchestral percussion (tracks 1, 2, 3, 6, 7, 8, 9)
 Adam Falkner - drums (tracks 1, 3, 4, 6, 7, 9, 10)
 Everton Nelson - violin (tracks 1, 2, 3, 4, 5, 7, 8, 9, 10, 11)
 Richard George - violin (tracks 1, 2, 3, 4, 5, 7, 8, 9, 10, 11)
 Rita Manning - violin (tracks 1, 2, 3, 4, 5, 7, 8, 9, 10, 11)
 Mark Berrow Boguslaw Kostecki - violin (tracks 1, 2, 3, 4, 5, 7, 8, 9, 10, 11)
 Ian Humphries - violin (tracks 1, 2, 3, 4, 5, 7, 8, 9, 10, 11)
 Tom Pigott Smith - violin (tracks 1, 2, 3, 4, 5, 7, 8, 9, 10, 11)
 Vicci Wardman - viola (tracks 1, 2, 3, 4, 5, 7, 8, 9, 10, 11)
 Bruce White - viola (tracks 1, 2, 3, 4, 5, 7, 8, 9, 10, 11)
 Rachel Stephanie Bolt - viola (tracks 1, 2, 3, 4, 5, 7, 8, 9, 10, 11)
 Chris Young - electric guitar (tracks 2, 7, 8)
 David Daniels - cello (tracks 2, 3, 4, 5, 7, 8, 9, 10, 11)
 Ian Burdge - cello (tracks 2, 3, 4, 5, 7, 8, 9, 10, 11)
 Chris Worsey - cello (tracks 2, 3, 4, 5, 7, 8, 9, 10, 11)
 Ian Mok - cello (track 1)
 Stacey Watton - double bass (tracks 1, 2, 3, 4, 5, 7, 8, 9, 10, 11)
 Strings arranged by Phildel Ng and James McWilliams (tracks 1, 2, 3, 4, 5, 7, 8, 9, 10, 11)
 Conductor: James McWilliams (tracks 1, 2, 3, 4, 5, 7, 8, 9, 10, 11)
 Choir: Ann De Ranais, Emma Brain Gabbott, Helen Brooks, Helen Parker, Jenny O'Grady, Joanna Forbes, Rachel Weston, Sarah Ryan (tracks 1, 2, 4, 6, 8, 11). Arranged by Phildel.

Charts

References

2013 debut albums
Decca Records albums